John John Yeosock (March 18, 1937 – February 15, 2012) was a United States Army lieutenant general who commanded the Third United States Army during Operation Desert Shield and Operation Desert Storm.

Early life
John J. Yeosock was born in Wilkes-Barre, Pennsylvania, on March 18, 1937, and grew up in Plains Township. He studied at the Valley Forge Military Academy where he graduated as valedictorian. Unable to get into West Point due to bad eyesight, Yeosock joined the Reserve Officers' Training Corps at Pennsylvania State University, graduating in 1959 with a B.S. degree in industrial engineering. He later earned an M.S. degree in operations research and systems analysis from the Naval Postgraduate School in 1969. As an infantry officer Yeosock served in the Vietnam War. During the 1980s, Yeosock was the head of an American military team sent to help modernize the Saudi Arabian National Guard.

Command

As a major general, Yeosock commanded the 1st Cavalry Division from June 1986 to May 1988, having been the 1st Cav's Assistant Division Commander (ADC) as a brigadier general during REFORGER in 1983. Promoted to lieutenant general, in 1989 he was given command of the Third United States Army. When Iraq invaded Kuwait, the Third Army was sent to Saudi Arabia in the buildup of coalition forces protecting the Kingdom during Operation Desert Shield. During the ground phase of the Gulf War, the 3rd Army formed the nucleus of the forces performing the "left hook" against the Iraqi Army. On February 19, 1991, he needed medical evacuation to Germany for emergency surgery, his command temporarily taken over by Lieutenant General Calvin Waller until his return to Saudi Arabia approximately ten days later. Yeosock retired from the army in August 1992.

Death
Yeosock died on February 15, 2012, in Fayetteville, Georgia, aged 74, from lung cancer and is interred at Arlington National Cemetery.

Family
Yeosock had two children with his wife Betta Hoffner: son John and daughter Elizabeth. Through the latter, he is the father-in-law of General Paul E. Funk II.

Awards

References

1937 births
2012 deaths
People from Wilkes-Barre, Pennsylvania
Valley Forge Military Academy and College alumni
Pennsylvania State University alumni
Naval Postgraduate School alumni
United States Army personnel of the Vietnam War
Recipients of the Meritorious Service Medal (United States)
Recipients of the Legion of Merit
United States Army generals
Recipients of the Legion of Honour
United States Army personnel of the Gulf War
Recipients of the Distinguished Service Medal (US Army)
Deaths from cancer in Georgia (U.S. state)
Deaths from lung cancer
Burials at Arlington National Cemetery
Military personnel from Pennsylvania